Paul Smiths is a hamlet and census-designated place (CDP) in the Town of Brighton in Franklin County, New York, United States. The population of the CDP was 671 at the 2010 census.

History
The hamlet was named after the Paul Smith's Hotel (formally known as the Saint Regis House), founded in 1859 by Apollos "Paul" Smith as one of the first wilderness resorts in the Adirondacks. Paul Smith's College was built on the site of the hotel after the hotel burned down in 1930. It was funded by the estate of Smith's son Phelps, who died in 1937. It is the locale of Osgood Pond, home of historic Northbrook Lodge, listed on the National Register of Historic Places in 2014, and of White Pine Camp, the Summer Whitehouse of President Calvin Coolidge.

Geography
Paul Smiths is located in the southern part of the Town of Brighton, between Lower St. Regis Lake to the south and Osgood Pond to the north. It is in southern Franklin County. The CDP limits correspond to the campus of Paul Smith's College.

New York State Route 30 passes Paul Smiths, leading north  to Malone, the Franklin County seat, and south  to Tupper Lake.

Demographics

Climate
The Köppen Climate Classification sub-type for this climate is "Dfb" (Warm Summer Continental Climate). Paul Smiths has a record high of 100, set in July 1936 and a record low of -48, set in January 1912, tying the state record low for January.

See also
Apollos Smith
Paul Smith's College Visitor Interpretive Center

References

Further reading
Jerome, Christine. Adirondack Passage: Cruise of Canoe Sairy Gamp, HarperCollins, 1994.

External links

New York Times, June 13, 1909, "PAUL SMITH'S.; The Vanderbilt Japanese Camp Being Made Ready for Occupancy."
 Read or listen to the Oral history of Paul Smiths in the late 19th early 20th Centuries

 
Census-designated places in Franklin County, New York
Census-designated places in New York (state)